Otto Krappan (11 October 1886 – 2 February 1942) was a German professional football manager.

Career
Born in Nagyszeben, Austria-Hungary, in a family of Transylvanian Saxons, (today Sibiu, Romania). Krappan managed several clubs in Italy between 1923 and 1942, year in which he suddenly died while training Palermo-Juve in Serie C.

He managed Udinese in Prima Divisione and Alessandria in 1934–35 Serie A.

References

1886 births
1942 deaths
Sportspeople from Sibiu
Transylvanian Saxon people
Serie A managers
German football managers
Udinese Calcio managers
A.C. Legnano managers
L.R. Vicenza managers
U.S. Alessandria Calcio 1912 managers
Calcio Lecco 1912 managers
Cosenza Calcio managers
U.S. Cremonese managers
Palermo F.C. managers
Expatriate football managers in Italy
A.S. Pro Gorizia managers